Norms Restaurants (stylized as NORMS) is a chain of diner-style restaurants in Southern California. Founded in 1949 by used-car salesman Norm Roybark, some restaurants are open 24 hours a day, 7 days a week.  the company operates 21 locations, all in the Los Angeles area.

History

The first Norms opened on Sunset Boulevard near Vine Street in 1949.  The oldest surviving Norms, declared Los Angeles Historic-Cultural Monument number 1090 in 2015, opened on La Cienega Boulevard in 1957, featuring a distinctive angular and brightly colored style that came to be known as Googie architecture.  Key characteristics include angular walls, large glass windows, jutting roof, and a neon marquee. Many Norms restaurants, including the 1957 La Cienega Boulevard location, were designed by the architectural firm of Armét & Davis to look like automobile showrooms with booths resembling bucket seats.  Their appearance has made them the subject of exhibitions curated by the Getty Center.

In December 2014, the Roybark family sold the family-owned Bellflower-based chain, but not the land each of the restaurants had sat on, to an investment firm, CapitalSpring, for an undisclosed amount. "We cut across everything," Mike Colonna, the new president of Norms said in 2019. "We have the blue collar workers, white collar workers with ties getting a quick lunch, ethnic diversity at every table. We get late-night millennials, and our base of baby boomers. We're kind of retro cool and we think the Googie architecture is a big part of the brand." When the real estate under the La Cienega store was sold, Colonna reassured customers that the business would stay. "Norms has committed to the location long term," Colonna told Los Angeles magazine. "We have an agreement with the landlord and plan to be in business for quite some time."

The Norms restaurant on Pico in West Los Angeles was forced to close on Christmas Eve 2016 because the new landlords refused to renew the lease and had other unspecified plans for the real estate. County assessor records showed that the Roybark family had sold the land in April 2015 for $8.25 million.

In popular culture

 Referred to in the intro to Tom Waits' "Eggs and Sausage" off of Nighthawks at the Diner
 The location of a popular hangout of the characters of the TNT show Men of a Certain Age
 Depicted in the 1964 painting "Norms La Cienega on Fire" by Edward Ruscha
 Mentioned briefly in the third episode of the first season of American Horror Story.
 In his autobiography, Graham Nash mentions he, Stephen Stills, and David Crosby would have breakfast at the Norm's on Sunset during the recording of CSN's debut album.
 In the film Woman in Gold (2015), starring Helen Mirren.
 In the film 10 to Midnight, Detective Leo Kessler (Charles Bronson) races past the location at 11001 West Pico Boulevard to save his daughter. Only the exterior is shown and even then only briefly.
 Recurring location in Amazon's Bosch
 On-site location for Carl Reiner/Mel Brooks episode of Comedians in Cars Getting Coffee - C2:E5

References

External links
 
 
 Norms Restaurant featured in Jerry Seinfeld's Comedians in Cars Getting Coffee episode with Mel Brooks and Carl Reiner "I want sandwiches, I want chicken"

1949 establishments in California
Companies based in Los Angeles County, California
Googie architecture in California
Restaurants established in 1949
Restaurants in Greater Los Angeles
Restaurants in Los Angeles
Restaurants in Orange County, California
Restaurants in Riverside County, California